Monilea philippii is a species of sea snail, a marine gastropod mollusk in the family Trochidae, the top snails.

Description
The rather solid, umbilical shell has an orbiculate-conoidal shape. and is radially painted in brown. The convex whorls are transversally crossed by cinguli of equal size and minutely crenulate. They are ornate with longitudinally striated interstices. The margin of the umbilicus has a spiral form with radial grooves. The columella is sinuous in the middle

Distribution
This marine species occurs off China.

References

External links
 To World Register of Marine Species

philippii
Gastropods described in 1855